Bella Emberg (born Sybil Dyke; 16 September 1937 – 12 January 2018) was an English comedy actress whose television career spanned 60 years.

Early life and career
Emberg was born in Brighton and grew up wanting to be an entertainer. Her professional debut was in weekly repertory in Ryde, Isle of Wight in the summer season of 1962, aged 25.

She appeared in TV series such as The Benny Hill Show, Robin's Nest, Softly, Softly, Z Cars, Bear Behaving Badly and Grange Hill. Her best-known role was in The Russ Abbot Show, where she played superheroine Blunderwoman alongside Abbot's Cooperman character. The show ran from 1980 to 1996, and at its peak attracted 18 million viewers.

Emberg also starred in Mel Brooks' film History of the World, Part I (1981). She made a guest appearance in the first episode of the revived version of  The Basil Brush Show in 2002, and also featured in Doctor Who four times. From 2008 to 2010 she appeared as Barney Harwood’s fictional Aunt Barbara in Bear Behaving Badly on CBBC. In 1965 she had an uncredited appearance in Undermind, (non-speaking) and other uncredited roles in the 1970s Third Doctor serials Doctor Who and the Silurians and The Time Warrior. In the revived series, she played Mrs Croot in Love & Monsters. She filmed a second appearance as Mrs Croot for The Runaway Bride, but this scene ended up on the cutting room floor.

Shortly before her death, she completed filming for In the Long Run, a Sky One comedy created by Idris Elba, due to be broadcast in April 2018.
Emberg's housemate found her collapsed at their home in London's Raynes Park on 12 January 2018, aged 80. Paramedics were unable to resuscitate her and she was found to have died from alcohol toxicity.

Filmography

References

External links

1937 births
2018 deaths
English television actresses
People from Hove
English film actresses
20th-century English actresses
21st-century English actresses
Actresses from Brighton
20th-century British businesspeople
Alcohol-related deaths in England